David McGuire (born 27 September 1980 in Bellshill) is a Scottish footballer who plays for junior club Lanark United. His previous senior clubs include Airdrie United.

Career
In late March 2000, McGuire was - like other players - allowed to leave due to Airdrie's uncertain future and he, along with Darren Brady, signed for Dundee United until the end of the season. The pair saw little action with United, with only Brady making a substitute appearance in the final game of the season and both players moved on to Livingston in the summer. McGuire spent a season at Almondvale before moving to newly formed Airdrie United, where he spent five seasons.

McGuire left the club in the summer of 2007 and moved into junior football.

Honours
Airdrieonians
Scottish Challenge Cup: 2000–01

References

External links

1980 births
Living people
Footballers from Bellshill
Scottish footballers
Scottish Football League players
Airdrieonians F.C. (1878) players
Dundee United F.C. players
Livingston F.C. players
Airdrieonians F.C. players
Cumbernauld United F.C. players
Lanark United F.C. players
Association football wingers
Thomas University alumni